The Washington Nationals are a current National League baseball team, formerly known as the Montreal Expos.

Washington Nationals may also refer to these other Washington, D.C.-based baseball teams (listed chronologically):
 Washington Nationals (National Association), a team of the 1870s
 Washington Nationals, a team in the National Association (1879–1880)
 Washington Nationals (American Association), a team that played in 1884
 Washington Nationals (Union Association), a team that played in 1884
 Washington Nationals (1886–1889), a National League team
 Washington Senators (1891–1899), an American Association and National League team, also called the Washington Nationals
 Washington Senators (1901–1960), an American League franchise, also known as the Washington Nationals between 1905 and 1955, now the Minnesota Twins

See also
 
 Washington National, alternate name for Ronald Reagan Washington National Airport, serving the District of Columbia
 Washington Senators (disambiguation)
 History of Washington, D.C. professional baseball